Charles Kenny McClatchy (March 25, 1927 – April 16, 1989) was an American newspaper publisher. He was a son of Carlos K. McClatchy, the first editor of The Fresno Bee. He became president of McClatchy Newspapers upon the death of his aunt, Eleanor McClatchy in 1980. Over the next decade, until his death, he guided the family-owned media company on a course that led toward The McClatchy Company, a major, nationwide newspaper chain.

References

1989 deaths
American publishers (people)
American male journalists
20th-century American journalists
1927 births
20th-century American non-fiction writers
20th-century American businesspeople
20th-century American male writers